Aftab Rural District is in Aftab District of Tehran County, Tehran province, Iran. At the National Census of 2006, its population was 14,847 in 3,520 households. There were 15,117 inhabitants in 4,148 households at the following census of 2011. At the most recent census of 2016, the population of the rural district was 12,626 in 3,727 households. The largest of its nine villages was Shahrak-e Resalat, with 8,625 people.

References 

Tehran County

Rural Districts of Tehran Province

Populated places in Tehran Province

Populated places in Tehran County